This article lists events that occurred during 1925 in Kingdom of Serbs, Croats and Slovenes.

Incumbents
King - Aleksandar Karađorđević
Prime Minister - Nikola Pašić

Events
January 5: Stjepan Radić, leader of the Croatian Republican Peasant Party is arrested.  
Elections held on February 8.
Celebrations held to mark the 1000th anniversary of the coronation of Tomislav of Croatia. Duvno is renamed to Tomislavgrad.

Arts and literature

Sport
National football champion: Jugoslavija Beograd
National water polo champion: VK Jug Dubrovnik

Births
Stojan Batič - Slovenian sculptor
Željko Čajkovski - Croatian footballer

Deaths
Antun Branko Šimić - Croatian poet (born 1898)

References

External links

 
 Yugoslavia
Belarus
1920s in  Yugoslavia
Years of the 20th century in  Yugoslavia